Mohammad Shamsul Haque is a Bangladesh Nationalist Party politician and the former Member of Parliament of Dhaka-29.

Career
Haque was elected to parliament from Dhaka-29 as a Bangladesh Nationalist Party candidate in 1979.

References

Bangladesh Nationalist Party politicians
Living people
2nd Jatiya Sangsad members
Year of birth missing (living people)